Maripí is a town and municipality in the Colombian Department of Boyacá, part of the subregion of the Western Boyacá Province. The town hosts an important emerald mine; La Pita.

See also 

 La Pita
 Muzo, Chivor, Somondoco

External links 

Municipalities of Boyacá Department